The 2011 season for  began in January at the Tour de San Luis and ended in October at the Giro di Lombardia. As a UCI ProTeam, they were automatically invited and obligated to send a squad to every event in the UCI World Tour.

With twenty victories to their credit, the team had a reasonably successful 2011 season competitively, but the year was very tumultuous for reasons outside competition. After a successful early season, including the overall crown at the Vuelta a Castilla y León, team rider Xavier Tondó was killed in a freak accident at his home while preparing for a training ride with teammate Beñat Intxausti. Later in the season, Mauricio Soler sustained a horrific crash at the Tour de Suisse, which could easily have cost him his life as well. After more than four months in the hospital, Soler was released, but his recovery was far from complete at that time.

2011 roster
Ages as of January 1, 2011.

Riders who joined the team for the 2011 season

Riders who left the team during or after the 2010 season

One-day races
Before the spring season and the races known as classics, the team got a win in the Vuelta a Mallorca series. After making a 40-rider selection with  remaining in the Trofeo Deià, Rojas won the resulting sprint among those riders.

Spring classics
The Vuelta a La Rioja was the team's first traditional one-day win. Erviti finished first ahead of two Colombian riders from a UCI Continental team, eight seconds ahead of the main field.

The team also sent squads to Milan–San Remo, Gent–Wevelgem, the Tour of Flanders, Paris–Roubaix, the Amstel Gold Race, La Flèche Wallonne and Liège–Bastogne–Liège, but placed no higher than 11th in any of these races.

Fall races
The team also sent squads to the Clásica de San Sebastián, the Grand Prix Cycliste de Québec, and the Giro di Lombardia, but placed no higher than 11th in any of these races.

Stage races
The team picked up wins in two simultaneous events at the beginning of the season. At the Tour de San Luis, new acquisition Tondó won the  individual time trial, gaining a 30-second lead over 's José Serpa in the process with three days left to race. In the race's penultimate stage, however, Tondó dramatically bonked and crashed on the descent of the Cerro El Amago, the day's last climb. He had stayed with the race's top riders and seemed to be a  descent and an easy, flat final stage away from winning the race. Instead, he lost 15 minutes on the day, and finished the race in 23rd place. Also in January, the squad sent to the Tour Down Under came away with another win. Ventoso won the race's queen stage in Willunga ahead of the sprinters who populated the top of the general classification standings. Ventoso was the squad's top finisher in the final overall standings, in sixth place. The squad narrowly won the teams classification, beating  by eight seconds. Ventoso added a sprint win in February in stage 3 of the Ruta del Sol. The team did not win any stage at Critérium International in March, but they did win the teams classification and have Kiryienka on the final podium in second. With strong placings in all three stages, Kiryienka also won the event's points classification. Rojas won the sprint finish to stage 6 of the concurrent Volta a Catalunya, with nearly the entire peloton finishing together.

Kiryienka won stage 2 at the Tour of the Basque Country with a late-race solo attack. He initially drew four others with him, but a second surge  from the line gave him the win two seconds ahead of the leading group on the road. It was the Belarusian's first race win since a stage in the 2008 Giro d'Italia. The squad also won the team award at this event. Later in April, the team had a very strong Vuelta a Castilla y León. Ventoso won the first two stages in field sprints, keying of the sprint train  was trying to use to set up their sprinter Russell Downing on both days. The overall classification was left wide open the next day when three-time champion Alberto Contador suffered mechanical trouble on the race's only summit finish, the Laguna de los Peces, and lost two minutes. Tondó finished fifth on the stage, and was in second overall just three seconds behind new race leader Bauke Mollema. Tondó was third in the race's individual time trial the next day, taking the race lead since he gained 12 seconds on Mollema. The time gaps held on the final stage, meaning Tondó won the race overall. Ventoso added a second place in stage 5 to his two wins earlier to handily win the points classification, though he would have won it even if he had not scored in the final stage. Neo-pro Sanz took the first win of his career at the Vuelta a la Comunidad de Madrid in a short road race held the same day as the prologue time trial. The young Spaniard came first in the field sprint. The next day, Costa finished second on the Puerto de la Morcuera summit by 14 seconds, but this performance was enough to make him the race's overall winner. The team also won two classification awards, with Costa taking the points title and Herrada the youth classification.

The team also sent squads to the Tour Méditerranéen, the Tour du Haut Var, Vuelta a Murcia, Paris–Nice, Tirreno–Adriatico, the Tour de Romandie, Vuelta a Asturias, the Circuit de Lorraine, the Critérium du Dauphiné, the Brixia Tour, the Tour de Pologne, the Eneco Tour, the Tour du Poitou-Charentes and the Tour of Beijing, but did not achieve a stage win, classification win, or podium finish in any of them.

Grand Tours

Giro d'Italia

Tour de France

Vuelta a España

Season victories

Away from competition

Death of Xavier Tondó

Mauricio Soler crash aftermath

Footnotes

References

2011 road cycling season by team
2011 in Spanish road cycling
Movistar Team (men's team)